Kromy is an urban locality (an urban-type settlement) and the administrative center of Kromskoy District of Oryol Oblast, Russia, located on the Kroma River (a tributary of the Oka)  southwest of Oryol. Population: 

It was first chronicled in 1147, the same year as Moscow. It was a seat of one of the Upper Oka Principalities of the 15th century. In 1595, it was fortified by Boris Godunov in order to defend the Grand Duchy of Moscow from the Tatar raids. During the Time of Troubles, it gained nationwide renown as a major stronghold of the rebels such as the Don Cossacks led by Andrey Korela and Ivan Bolotnikov's generals.

Kromy was an important agricultural center throughout the 19th century. A railway from Moscow to Kharkov reached it in the 1850s. A large Neoclassical cathedral dates from this period. Kromy was contested by Anton Denikin's forces and the Red Army in October 1919.

Kromy lost its town status and was demoted to an urban-type settlement in 1924.

References

Urban-type settlements in Oryol Oblast
Kromskoy Uyezd
Former cities in Russia